Biswamohan Debbarma declared himself as a chairman of the National Liberation Front of Tripura of his own faction. In May 2017 in a meeting at an undisclosed location, selected Subir Debbarma alias Yamorok (45), as the new 'president' of the organization hence renamed NLFT SD which later signed a Memo of Settlement with Govt. of India on 10 August 2019. He is currently wanted by India and Interpol for crimes against life and health, and crimes involving the use of weapons/explosives.

References

Living people
Tripuri nationalism
1968 births
Crime in Tripura
Tripuri independence activists